The 2013 Oceania Handball Champions Cup was held in Sydney, Australia on 18 and 19 May 2013. This was organised by the Oceania Handball Federation and featured teams from Australia and New Zealand.

The tournament was won by Australian team Sydney University who then won the right to represent Oceania in the 2013 IHF Super Globe.

Results

Leg One

Leg Two

References

External links
 Sydney Uni webpage
 NSWHF webpage
 Auckland webpage

2013
2013 in handball
International handball competitions hosted by Australia
2013 in Australian sport
International sports competitions hosted at Sydney Olympic Park
August 2013 events in Oceania